Ama Pomaa Boateng (born 19 August 1975) is a Ghanaian politician. She is the New Patriotic Party member of parliament for the Juaben Constituency in the Ashanti Region of Ghana.

Early life and education 
Ama Pomaa was born on 19 August 1975 in Juaben, Ashanti Region. She had her senior high school education at the Holy Child School in Cape Coast and earned a master's degree in information studies from Anglia Ruskin University. Ama holds a certificate in computing from Westminster University in London, UK. In 2012 she acquired a certificate in e-waste from the United Nations e-waste Academy. She also holds certificates from Penn Foster, Wild PCS, Harvard University and House of Democracy Partnership/ NDI.

Career 
Ama Pomaa is an IT consultant by profession and the executive director for Ghanaian High-tech Women in Accra, an NGO in IT training. She serves as the co-chair of Ghana’s eParliament /ICT Steering Committee. Ama is a board member of the National Petroleum Authority in Ghana, where she serves as the Chairperson of the Complaints and Settlements Subcommittee.

Politics 
Ama Pomaa contested and won the parliamentary seat for the Juaben Constituency the Ashanti Region during the 2016 Ghanaian general elections. Three other candidates, namely Nana Prempeh Amankwaah of the National Democratic Congress, and Gallo Stephen Ayitey of the Conventions Peoples Party also contested in the 2016 by-election of the Juaben Constituency held on 7 December 2016. She won the election by obtaining 22,323 votes out of the 29,606 cast, representing 75.40 percent of total valid votes.

Committees 
Ama Pomaa is member of Gender and Children Committee and also a member of Food, Agriculture and Cocoa Affairs Committee.

Foundation 
Through her foundation, she ran a Cisco Networking Academy program for young women.

Personal life 
Ama Pomaa is married with one child. She is also a Christian.

References 

Living people
New Patriotic Party politicians
1975 births
Women members of the Parliament of Ghana
Alumni of Holy Child High School, Ghana
Ghanaian MPs 2017–2021
Ghanaian MPs 2021–2025
21st-century Ghanaian women politicians